NGC 72 is a barred spiral galaxy estimated to be about 320 million light-years away in the constellation of Andromeda. It was discovered by R. J. Mitchell in 1855 and its magnitude is 13.5.

References

External links
 

0072
001204
Andromeda (constellation)
18551007
Spiral galaxies